Narcetes shonanmaruae, the yokozuna slickhead, is a species of marine ray-finned fish, a slickhead belonging to the family Alepocephalidae. The specific name references Shonan Maru, the ship the specimens were collected from. The proposed English name, yokozuna slickhead, refers to the highest ranking of sumo wrestler, the yokozuna.

References 

Alepocephalidae
Taxa named by Jan Yde Poulsen, 
Taxa named by Hitoshi Ida 
Taxa named by Masaru Kawato
Taxa named by Yoshihiro Fujiwara
Fish described in 2021